This is a filmography of Mickey Rourke. This list includes information about films starring Mickey Rourke, notes, awards, his television works, trivia, highest-grossing films, critical acclaim of Rourke's films, shows in which he appeared, and roles he turned down among other things. It also provides information about other work and previous collaborations of Rourke. A recently published book, Everything I Need to Know I Learned from Mickey Rourke Movies by Dan Rempala, explores life lessons provided by Rourke's films.

Mickey Rourke began his career in the film 1941, directed by Steven Spielberg. Later, Rourke starred in several television films and made brief appearances in feature films. He made his breakthrough performance in the film Diner. Later, his career continued with popular films such as 9½ Weeks, The Pope of Greenwich Village, Rumble Fish, Year of the Dragon, Barfly, Angel Heart and many more. Rourke also starred in a film about Francis of Assisi called Francesco. In the early 1990s, he returned to boxing and didn't star in many films. He also turned down many roles that proved to be fortuitous for other actors. In the 2000s, he returned to prominence and won a Saturn Award for his performance in Sin City. Rourke has worked with well-known actors including Jack Nicholson, Robert De Niro and Christopher Walken.

Rourke starred in theater films, direct-to-video films and television works. He also wrote some of his films under the name "Sir" Eddie Cook.

Film

Television

Video games

Awards and nominations

Other works
Rourke made his stage debut in a revival of Arthur Miller's "A View From the Bridge". He provided the mid-song rap on the David Bowie song "Shining Star (Makin' My Love)" on Bowie's album Never Let Me Down (1987) and appeared as a gangster in the music video for "Hero" by Enrique Iglesias. He appeared in a Japanese TV commercial for Suntory Reserve (early '90s), a commercial for Daihatsu and Lark cigarettes, and a commercial for DirecTV. He also appeared in the music video for the song Shuttin' Detroit Down by John Rich.

References
 
 
 
 
 

Specific

External links
 

! colspan="3" style="background:#DAA520;" | National Society of Film Critics

! colspan="3" style="background:#DAA520;" | Saturn Awards

! colspan="3" style="background:#DAA520;" | Golden Globe Awards

Male actor filmographies
American filmographies